Perumpoondi is a village located in the  Ginee taluk  Viluppuram district of Tamil Nadu, India.

Villages in Viluppuram district